Niedersimmental District was one of the 26 administrative districts in the canton of Bern, Switzerland. Its capital was the municipality of Wimmis. The district had an area of 319 km² and consisted of 9 municipalities:

References

Former districts of the canton of Bern